National Route 15 also known as Corredor Bioceánico (officially, PY15) is one of 22 national routes of Paraguay.
It has an extension of 531 km, in the middle of the Paraguayan Chaco. Along with routes PY14 and PY16, it is one of the three routes that the Alto Paraguay department will possess for the first time, helping it to come out of isolation. At the beginning of the section of this route, the international bridge that will connect Carmelo Peralta with Porto Murtinho (Brazil) is under construction, which will be financed by Itaipu.
This highway (currently under construction) is expected to become an international logistics center by becoming part of the Bi-Oceanic Corridor, and being the shortest passage between the Chilean ports of Antofagasta and Iquique on the Pacific Ocean and the Brazilian port of Santos on the Atlantic Ocean.

History 
With the Resolution N° 1090/19, it obtained its current number and elevated to National Route in 2019 by the MOPC (Ministry of Public Works and Communications).

In February 2022, Paraguay inaugurated 275 km of the road (about half of the route), connecting Carmelo Peralta (Alto Paraguay), on the border with Brazil, to Loma Plata (Boquerón), in the center of the country.

Distances, cities and towns 

The following table shows the distances traversed by PY15 in each different department, showing cities and towns that it passes by (or near).

References 

15